Miki Motono (本野美樹, born May 18, 1994) is a Japanese mixed martial artist, currently competing in the atomweight division of Deep Jewels. A professional competitor since 2019, she is the former Deep Jewels interim strawweight champion.

Mixed martial arts career

DEEP JEWELS

Early career
Motono made her professional debut against Mariya Suzuki at HEAT 44 on March 2, 2019. She utilized her superior grappling to win the fight by unanimous decision, with all three judges awarding her both rounds of the bout.

Motono faced the more experienced Mika Nagano (16–11–1) at Deep Jewels 24 on June 9, 2019, in her second professional appearance. She won the fight by unanimous decision, with all three judges once again awarding her both rounds of the bout.

Motono moved out of Japan for her next bout, as she faced the Eternal MMA strawweight champion Casey O'Neill at Eternal MMA 48 on October 4, 2019, in O'Neill's native Melbourne, Australia. O'Neill won the fight by unanimous decision, handing Motono her first professional loss.

Motono returned to Deep Jewels for her next bout, as she faced Nongpan Kanjana at Deep Jewels 28 on February 24, 2020. She won the fight by a first-round technical knockout, stopping Nongpan with grounded strikes.

Interim strawweight champion
Her 2–0 record with the promotion earned Motono the chance to face Asami Nakai for the Deep Jewels interim Strawweight Championship at Deep Jewels 29 on July 23, 2020. She won the fight by a first-round technical knockout, stopping Nakai with ground and pound near the end of the opening round.

As the full champion Mizuki Inoue was still competing in the UFC, Motono was booked to face the promotional newcomer Seika Izawa in a non-title bout at Deep Jewels 31 on December 19, 2020. She lost the fight by unanimous decision, with scores of 30–27, 30–27 and 29–28. 

Izawa and Motono were expected to rematch for the interim Jewels strawweight championship at Deep Jewels 32 on March 7, 2021, before Motono withdrew due to a partial rupture of the ligament in her knee. The fight was rescheduled for Deep Jewels 33 on June 20, 2021. She lost the fight by submission, tapping to an armbar at the 3:32 minute mark of the first round.

Post title career
Motono faced Namiko Kawabata at Deep Jewels 35 on December 11, 2021. She successfully snapped her two-fight losing streak, as she won the fight by unanimous decision.

Motono dropped down to super atomweight in order to face Mizuki Oshiro at Deep Jewels 36 on March 12, 2022. She won the fight by a first-round submission, forcing Oshiro to tap in the last minute of the round. Following this victory, Fight Matrix ranked Motono as the tenth best atomweight in the world in their June 2022 rankings.

Motono faced Moeri Suda in a super atomweight bout at Deep Jewels 39 on November 23, 2022. She won the fight by unanimous decision.

Championships and accomplishments
 DEEP JEWELS
Deep Jewels interim Strawweight Championship

Mixed martial arts record

 
|-
| Win
|align=center| 8–3
|Moeri Suda
|Decision (unanimous)
|Deep Jewels 39
|
|align=center| 3
|align=center| 5:00
|Tokyo, Japan
|
|-
| Win
| align=center| 7–3
| Mizuki Oshiro
| Submission (armbar)
| Deep Jewels 36
| 
| align=center| 1
| align=center| 4:18
| Tokyo, Japan
| Super atomweight debut
|-
| Win
| align=center| 6–3
| Namiko Kawabata
| Decision (unanimous)
| Deep Jewels 35
| 
| align=center| 2
| align=center| 5:00
| Tokyo, Japan
| 
|-
| Loss
| align=center| 5–3
| Seika Izawa
| Submission (armbar)
| Deep Jewels 33
| 
| align=center| 1
| align=center| 3:22
| Tokyo, Japan
| Lost the Deep Jewels interim Strawweight Championship
|-
| Loss
| align=center| 5–2
| Seika Izawa
| Decision (unanimous)
| Deep Jewels 31
| 
| align=center| 3
| align=center| 5:00
| Tokyo, Japan
| 
|-
| Loss
| align=center| 5–1
| Asami Nakai
| TKO (Punches)
| Deep Jewels 29
| 
| align=center| 1
| align=center| 4:23
| Tokyo, Japan
| Won the Deep Jewels interim Strawweight Championship
|-
| Win
| align=center| 4–1
| Nongpan Kanjana
| TKO (Punches)
| Deep Jewels 28
| 
| align=center| 1
| align=center| 4:27
| Tokyo, Japan
| 
|-
| Win
| align=center| 3–1
| Ji Young Park
| Submission (armbar)
| DEEP 93 Impact
| 
| align=center| 1
| align=center| 3:36
| Tokyo, Japan
| 
|-
| Loss
| align=center| 2–1
| Casey O'Neill
| Decision (unanimous)
| Eternal MMA 48
| 
| align=center| 5
| align=center| 5:00
| Melbourne, Australia
| For the vacant EMMA Strawweight Championship  O'Neill missed weight (115.4 lb) and was stripped of the title
|-
| Win
| align=center| 2–0
| Mika Nagano
| Decision (unanimous)
| Deep Jewels 24
| 
| align=center| 2
| align=center| 5:00
| Tokyo, Japan
| 
|-
| Win
| align=center| 1–0
| Mariya Suzuki
| Decision (unanimous)
| HEAT 44
| 
| align=center| 2
| align=center| 5:00
| Nagoya, Japan
| Strawweight debut
|-

See also
 List of female mixed martial artists

References

1994 births
Japanese female mixed martial artists
Living people
Atomweight mixed martial artists
Strawweight mixed martial artists
Mixed martial artists utilizing judo
Mixed martial artists utilizing wrestling
Japanese female judoka
21st-century Japanese women